The 2014–15 season was the 12th season in the Football League played by Yeovil Town Football Club, an English football club based in Yeovil, Somerset. Their relegation from the Championship in the 2013–14 season meant an immediate return to League One.

Manager Gary Johnson signed ten players before the close of the summer transfer window. The season started poorly with two consecutive league defeats and despite a brief improvement in form in late August and September, Yeovil remained in the relegation zone from October until the end of the season. The club's poor form led to the departure of Johnson in February, but his replacement Terry Skiverton could not arrest the Glovers plight and after six consecutive league defeats was replaced by Paul Sturrock. His first match in charge saw Yeovil's back-to-back relegation to League Two confirmed.

The club reached the third round of the FA Cup, losing to Premier League side Manchester United having beaten Crawley Town and Accrington Stanley in the preceding rounds. Yeovil were eliminated in the first round of both the League Cup and the Football League Trophy, losing to Gillingham and Portsmouth respectively. James Hayter and January signing Gozie Ugwu were the club's top scorers with 5 goals each, with all of those coming in the league.

Background

The 2013–14 season saw Yeovil compete in the second tier of English football for the first time in their history following promotion to the Championship via the 2013 Football League One play-off final. Despite starting the season with victory at Millwall on the opening day, the club only won eight league matches all season being relegated with a match to spare. The club finished bottom of the league seven points from safety having suffered the first relegation in 19 years. Despite relegation in the league Yeovil reached the fourth round of the FA Cup for only the third time in the club's history losing 2–0 to Premier League side Southampton.

The end of the season featured a large turnover of players with four being released, including club captain Jamie McAllister, defender Joey Jones, midfielder Rubén Palazuelos and forward Reuben Reid. Six players were offered new contracts goalkeepers Chris Dunn and Marek Štěch and defender Byron Webster rejected the offer of new contracts, while James Hayter and Seth Nana Twumasi signed new contracts with the club. Defenders Calvin Brooks and Nathan Ralph were invited back for pre-season training while Luke Ayling rejected a new contract.

Review

Pre-season

The squad returned for pre-season training on 1 July. The first day of pre-season saw the squad joined by six new signings, former Yeovil youth team goalkeeper Chris Weale returned to the club from Shrewsbury Town, Polish goalkeeper Artur Krysiak joined Yeovil from Exeter City, former Liverpool defender Jakub Sokolík, ex-Southampton centre-back Aaron Martin, former Crewe Alexandra striker A-Jay Leitch-Smith, and Jamaican international defender Nathan Smith returned to the club three years after leaving for Chesterfield all signing two-year contracts. The players were joined on 3 July by Carlisle United midfielder James Berrett signing a two-year contract having rejected a new deal from the Cumbrians. On 8 July, Yeovil full-back Luke Ayling joined fellow League One side Bristol City after the two clubs agreed an undisclosed compensation fee. The same day saw the club sign Bristol City right-back Brendan Moloney following the cancellation of his contract signing a two-year contract with the Glovers. The club announced that local Italian restaurant chain Tamburino would become the new Main Stand sponsor at Huish Park.

On 9 July, the club confirmed that defender Seth Nana Twumasi had signed a new one-year contract prior to the team's first friendly of pre-season against Frome Town. Yeovil ran out 6–1 winners thanks to two goals from both Leitch-Smith and Kieffer Moore and a goal each from Sam Hoskins and Sam Foley. Yeovil confirmed the signing, on 11 July, of Cardiff City defender Ben Nugent on loan until 4 January. Yeovil's second pre-season, on 12 July, friendly saw them travel to Basingstoke Town but despite a Sam Hoskins goal they were held to a 1–1 draw against their Conference South opponents. Yeovil's third pre-season friendly saw them face Conference National side Torquay United, despite goals from Leitch-Smith and French trialist Kamel Chergui the club were held to a 2–2 draw. On 19 July, Yeovil faced Championship side Reading in their first home friendly. A Pavel Pogrebnyak goal gave Reading an early second half lead before Yeovil equalised through "Trialist B", later revealed to be Achille Campion, as the Glovers earned a 1–1 draw. Yeovil's second home pre-season friendly, on 22 July, saw them beat non-league side Bristol Rovers 2–0 thanks to a brace from Leitch-Smith.

On 27 July, Yeovil suffered their first pre-season defeat losing 4–1 at home to Championship side Cardiff City despite leading 1–0 at half-time thanks to another Leitch-Smith goal. The club bounced back from their defeat with a 2–1 victory away at League Two side Plymouth Argyle with goals from Liam Davis and Sam Hoskins. Prior to their friendly victory the club announced their squad numbers for the new season and included former non-contract defender Calvin Brooks indicating that he had been offered a contract for the new season. The 1 August, saw Yeovil announce local taxi firm Radio Cabs as the new sponsor for the Away Stand at Huish Park. Following a brief training camp in Cornwall, Yeovil's penultimate friendly saw them face Truro City as part of the Cornish club's 125th Anniversary celebrations. Goals from trialist Simon Gillett and former Truro forward Kieffer Moore earned Yeovil a 2–1 victory. Yeovil completed their pre-season with a visit to Dorchester Town on 4 August. Hat-tricks from James Hayter and Sam Hoskins along with goals from Seth Nana Twumasi, Matteo Lanzoni and Sam Foley saw Yeovil run out 9–0 victors. On 7 August, the club confirmed the signing of former Nottingham Forest midfielder Simon Gillett on a two-year contract, and the following day confirmed that defender Nathan Ralph had signed a six-month contract extension. Forward Adam Morgan, on 8 August, signed for Scottish Premiership side St Johnstone on a five-month loan deal until mid-January 2015. On the same day manager Gary Johnson announced versatile midfielder Joe Edwards as his captain for the forthcoming season.

August
Yeovil's League One season started with a home fixture against fellow relegated side Doncaster Rovers, on 9 August, Yeovil lost the game 3–0. On 12 August, Yeovil faced Gillingham in the first round of the Football League Cup losing 2–1 at home with only a Simon Gillett goal to show for their efforts and a red card for Seth Nana Twumasi compounding a miserable evening. Yeovil then travelled to Gillingham in the League on 16 August, an early Kieffer Moore penalty miss saw the club suffer a 2–0 defeat their second in five days. On 19 August, Yeovil earned their first victory of the season away at Walsall, courtesy of goals from James Hayter and Kevin Dawson leading Yeovil to a 2–1 win. On 23 August, Yeovil faced Scunthorpe United at home despite Kieffer Moore giving Yeovil the lead, a late equaliser from former Glover Paddy Madden held Yeovil to a 1–1 draw. Italian defender Matteo Lanzoni left the club, on 28 August, after his contract was terminated by mutual consent after six months with the club, later that day joining League Two side Cambridge United. Yeovil ended the month with another 1–1 home draw this time against Barnsley on 30 August.

September

Transfer deadline day saw Yeovil bring in Wolverhampton Wanderers midfielder Jack Price on a one-month emergency loan deal as cover for the injured Simon Gillett. On 2 September, Yeovil faced League Two side Portsmouth in the first round of the Football League Trophy at Huish Park. Despite a good first half, Yeovil lost the match 3–1 with left-sided player Nathan Ralph scoring the club's consolation goal. On 6 September, Yeovil travelled to Bradford City and secured a 3–1 victory courtesy of a first-half brace from defender Aaron Martin, and a first goal for the club from A-Jay Leitch-Smith. Yeovil's four game unbeaten run in the league came to an end away at Coventry City, on 13 September, in a 2–1 defeat with Sam Foley grabbing the Yeovil goal. Following the match, Yeovil signed Blackburn Rovers goalkeeper Jake Kean on a one-month loan deal. Kean made his Yeovil debut against bottom club Crewe Alexandra, on 16 September, the visitors opened the scoring through Billy Waters but they only led for ten minutes with substitute Kieffer Moore earning Yeovil a draw. On 19 September, forward Sam Hoskins joined Conference Premier side Barnet on a short-term loan deal. The following day, Yeovil faced Peterborough United at home and earned their first home victory of the season and first clean sheet courtesy of a late goal from Jamaican international Joel Grant. Young defender Calvin Brooks joined Southern League Premier side Weymouth on an initial one-month loan deal on 26 September. On 27 September, Yeovil travelled to Crawley Town but lost 2–0 due to a brace from Marvin Elliott.

October
On 2 October, Manchester City striker Jordy Hiwula joined Yeovil on loan until 5 January. The 4 October, saw Yeovil face Milton Keynes Dons at Huish Park, MK Dons won the match 2–0 thanks to two second-half goals against a ten-man Yeovil side following Ben Nugent's dismissal for a second bookable offence. On 11 October, Yeovil travelled to Port Vale and lost the match 4–1 with an Aaron Martin goal the only thing to show for Yeovil's efforts as the club slipped back into the relegation zone of League One. Following the match, Yeovil signed Crystal Palace defender Ryan Inniss on a youth loan for an initial month. Inniss made his debut in an improved performance, on 18 October against Swindon Town. Despite James Hayter giving Yeovil a first-half lead a goal from former Glover Andy Williams earned Swindon a 1–1 draw. The following week saw Yeovil lose 2–0 away at Sheffield United, followed by a 3–0 home defeat to Rochdale which saw the club drop to 23rd in League One. On 27 October, Yeovil were drawn at home to Crawley Town in the first round of the FA Cup.

After a month which brought just 1 point from 5 league matches, the end of the month saw a high turnover of players, with goalkeeper Jed Steer signing on loan from Aston Villa and defender Stephen Arthurworrey signing on loan from Fulham both until 31 January, while right back Jordan Clarke joined from Coventry City until 5 January with Yeovil topscorer Aaron Martin moving in the other direction. While defender Jakub Sokolík joined Southend United on a 28-day loan deal.

November
On 1 November, Yeovil ended their three match losing run with a goalless draw away at Chesterfield, keeping only their second clean sheet of the season. Attacking midfielder Joel Grant was once again called up to the Jamaica national football team for the 2014 Caribbean Cup between 11–18 November. The FA Cup first round saw Yeovil face Crawley Town, on 8 November, and won the game thanks to a first professional goal for Jordy Hiwula. The second round draw saw Yeovil drawn away at the winner of Notts County or Accrington Stanley. The 11 November, saw Yeovil face Western League side Hengrove Athletic in the second round of the Somerset Premier Cup. Yeovil secured a club competition record victory a 13–0 win, despite being only 2–0 up at half-time, thanks to hat-tricks from James Hayter and Jordy Hiwula as well as goals Berrett, Foley, Leitch-Smith, Gillett, Davis and a brace from Seth Nana Twumasi. On 15 November, goalkeeper Chris Weale joined League Two side Burton Albion on a month's loan deal. Later that day Yeovil slipped to the bottom of the league table after 1–0 defeat against Fleetwood Town following a solitary Jeff Hughes goal. On 17 November, Yeovil announced that defender Ryan Inniss had extended his loan from Crystal Palace until 20 December. Yeovil's first victory for two months came away at play-off chasing Notts County, on 22 November, following a controversial red card for Notts midfielder Gary Jones after half an hour, Yeovil eventually won the match 2–1 with two late headers from full back Jordan Clarke. The match was to be Jordy Hiwula last game for the club having been sent back to Manchester City, on 27 November, Yeovil signed Bolton Wanderers forward Tom Eaves on loan until 5 January. On 28 November, Yeovil signed former Fulham and Swindon Town left-sided player Alex Smith on a month-long deal. Yeovil ended the month with a 2–0 defeat against Preston North End, including a goal from former Yeovil captain Paul Huntington, Yeovil ended the game with ten men following a red card for defender Ryan Inniss.

December
On 2 December, Southend United announced they had extended the loan of Yeovil defender Jakub Sokolík until 3 January. Yeovil travelled to Accrington Stanley, for the first competitive meeting between the two clubs, in the FA Cup second round. After taking the lead through another Jordan Clarke header, a desperately poor second half from Yeovil saw them hanging on for a 1–1 draw and a replay. The 13 December saw the second meeting between Gary Johnson and his son Lee, as Yeovil travelled to Oldham Athletic. Yeovil ran out convincing 4–0 winners with goals from Stephen Arthurworrey, Simon Gillett, Sam Hoskins and Kieffer Moore. After picking up a serious knee injury whilst on loan at Southend United Sokolík had his loan spell cut short at returned to Yeovil. On 16 December, Yeovil faced Accrington at home in their FA Cup Second Round replay, and won the match 2–0 courtesy of two late goals from Simon Gillett and Kieffer Moore, to set up a third round tie at home against Manchester United. On 20 December, Yeovil's first match of the festive period saw them face Colchester United in a relegation six-pointer, the game was decided late on with Craig Eastmond winning it for Colchester and leapfrogging Yeovil in the table in the process. Boxing Day saw Yeovil travel to Ashton Gate to face league leaders Bristol City, despite Jed Steer saving a first-half penalty from former Glover Kieran Agard in the first half Yeovil went in behind at half time following a Matt Smith header. Yeovil fell further behind after conceding a second penalty converted by Jay Emmanuel-Thomas and despite a first goal for the club from Ben Nugent, with a 35-yard shot, Yeovil lost the game 2–1 and slipped to the bottom of the league. Yeovil ended 2014 with another six-pointer at home against Leyton Orient losing the game 3–0 and ending the year five points from safety.

January
The opening of the January transfer window, saw right-back Brendan Moloney be sent out on loan to League Two side Northampton Town until the end of the season. On 4 January, Yeovil faced Premier League side Manchester United in the FA Cup third round at Huish Park. A 9,264 sell-out saw Yeovil hold their illustrious opponents for over an hour before eventually succumbing to a 2–0 defeat. Following the match, Yeovil extended the loan of Ben Nugent from Cardiff City until the end of the season, while Jordan Clarke, Tom Eaves and Ryan Inniss returned to their respective parent clubs. On 8 January, left-sided player Nathan Ralph extended his contract until the end of the season, the following day saw the departure of centre-back Aaron Martin to Coventry City after being released from his Yeovil contract. On 12 January, Yeovil traveled to Barnsley and following a sending off for Ben Nugent, for raising his elbow, ten-man Yeovil lost the match 2–0. Following the game the club confirmed that midfielders Kevin Dawson and Simon Gillett both face long-term absences after suffering injuries during the Manchester United FA Cup game. On 14 January, Yeovil made their first signing of the transfer window bringing in Jamaican international striker Jamar Loza on loan from Norwich City on a one-month youth loan deal. The following day Yeovil confirmed the signing of striker and Dunfermline Athletic top goalscorer Gozie Ugwu on a short-term contract after his release from the Scottish League One side, while young defender Calvin Brooks left the club to join Southern League side Weymouth after the expiry of his contract. On 17 January, prior to their match against Bradford City, Yeovil confirmed the signing of Swansea City right back Liam Shephard on a youth loan deal. Despite needing to play Kieffer Moore as an emergency centre-back Yeovil recorded their second home league win of the season, with Ugwu on his second debut for the club grabbing the winning goal in a 1–0 victory. On 20 January, Yeovil traveled to Preston North End with Ugwu scoring his second goal in as many games to give Yeovil the lead before Preston equalised late on through Sylvan Ebanks-Blake with the game ending 1–1. Yeovil then faced Coventry City at home, with a Jed Steer penalty save helping the club extend their unbeaten run to three games and move off the foot of the league table with a goalless draw. On 29 January, the club announced the extension of Fulham defender Stephen Arthurworrey's loan until the end of the season and the signing of former Mansfield Town midfielder Fergus Bell until the end of the season. While the chances of extending the loan of Aston Villa goalkeeper Jed Steer was ended after Villa refused to extend his loan. On 31 January, Yeovil visited Peterborough United losing the game 1–0 on a poor pitch slipping back to the bottom of the league.

February

Transfer deadline day was quiet for Yeovil with only the permanent departure of Brendan Moloney to League Two side Northampton Town after he was released from his Yeovil contract. On 4 February, Gary Johnson was relieved of his duties as first-team manager, after seven years with the club over two spells, and replaced by his assistant and predecessor Terry Skiverton as acting manager. Skiverton's first match in charge was a six-pointer at home against Crawley Town, on 7 February, two second half goals from Gozie Ugwu and A-Jay Leitch-Smith saw Yeovil win 2–1 and move off the bottom of the table. The following week saw Yeovil suffer back to back away defeats, a 1–0 reverse against  Crewe Alexandra, was followed by a 3–0 defeat against Doncaster Rovers which saw the club return to the bottom of the league. In response to back-to-back defeats Skiverton made four signings midfielder Craig Eastmond joined on a short-term contract until the end of the season, Swansea City players Stephen Kingsley and Josh Sheehan signed on a one-month emergency loans while defender Byron Webster returned to the club on loan from Millwall until the end of the season. In addition to this defender Liam Shephard extended his youth loan from Swansea City until the end of the season. On 21 February, Yeovil stayed bottom of the league after a 2–2 draw against Gillingham, Gozie Ugwu has given Yeovil an early lead before Gillingham fought back to lead 2–1 before Adam Morgan, on his first appearance for almost a year, scored an injury-time penalty to earn Yeovil a point. Yeovil ended the month with a trip to Scunthorpe United, Jamaican winger Joel Grant gave Yeovil the lead on his return from injury before goalkeeper Artur Krysiak suffered a head injury and being replaced by goalkeeping-coach Gareth Stewart. Who right on half time managed to save a Paddy Madden penalty to preserve the advantage, before Hakeeb Adelakun's second-half equaliser earned Scunthorpe a draw.

March

After Artur Krysiak suffered a head injury, requiring 10 stitches, Yeovil signed goalkeeper Scott Loach on loan from Rotherham United on a one-month emergency loan deal. On 3 March, Yeovil faced Walsall and Loach on his debut saved a first-half penalty before former loan striker Jordi Hiwula gave Walsall the lead which they held until the final whistle after Adam Morgan had his penalty saved by Walsall keeper Richard O'Donnell. On 7 March, Yeovil secured three points against Oldham Athletic after Joel Grant scored a second half equaliser before James Hayter hit an injury-time winner, to move within three points of safety. The club then subsequently lost their final four matches in March, 3–0 defeats at home to Bristol City, and away at relegation rivals Leyton Orient, were followed by a 2–0 defeat at second bottom Colchester United, and a 2–1 away defeat at Rochdale which left Yeovil ten points adrift of safety. In between the Colchester and Rochdale defeats, Yeovil progressed through to the semi-finals of the Somerset Premier Cup with a penalty shootout victory over Larkhall Athletic on 24 March.

April and May
On 3 April, Yeovil faced play-off chasing Chesterfield and despite taking a 2–0 lead through James Hayter and Sam Foley, a mid-second half collapse saw Yeovil concede three goals in just ten minutes to lose the match 3–2. Easter Monday, saw Yeovil lose 4–0 away at Fleetwood Town, to leave the club thirteen points adrift of safety.

Following this sixth consecutive league defeat the club announced, on 9 April, the appointment of Paul Sturrock as the club's new first team manager with acting manager Terry Skiverton and acting assistant manager Darren Way reverting to their former jobs. Sturrock's first game in charge saw Yeovil face Notts County but despite taking the lead through a Haydn Hollis own goal a late Garry Thompson equaliser saw Yeovil suffer back-to-back relegations. With relegation already confirmed Yeovil faced play-off chasers Sheffield United, on 14 April, and recorded a 1–0 win thanks to a Stephen Arthurworrey goal. Yeovil then traveled to face promotion-chasing Swindon Town on 18 April, before the match manager Paul Sturrock confirmed the departure of player/goalkeeper coach Gareth Stewart with immediate effect due to financial cutbacks. A first goal for the club from midfielder James Berrett helped Yeovil to another 1–0 victory, their first successive victories since December 2013. On 21 April, Yeovil faced Bridgwater Town in the semi-final of the Somerset Premier Cup goals from James Hayter and a double from Fergus Bell helped Yeovil to a 3–1 win and a place in the final. Yeovil's final home game of the season saw the first defeat of Sturrock's reign with Port Vale winning the match 2–1 with Gozie Ugwu scoring Yeovil's only goal. After the game Yeovil's annual end of season awards, saw midfielder Sam Foley completing a near clean sweep winning five of the seven awards. Yeovil's league season ended with a 5–1 defeat away at Milton Keynes Dons, in a game which saw their opponents promoted as runners-up. On 7 May, Yeovil faced Southern League side Taunton Town in the final of the Somerset Premier Cup, with Yeovil naming no substitutes on the bench for the fixture. The club lost the match 1–0 after extra time.

Summary and aftermath
Yeovil occupied a relegation position for the majority of the season and from October until the end of the season. In the league the team won 5 matches, drew 7 and lost 11 at home, compared to winning 5, drawing 3 and losing 15 away from home. The club's 26 league defeats was the most suffered by Yeovil in their history and their total of 36 league goals their fewest since the Second World War. Nathan Smith recorded the highest number of appearances during the season, appearing in 46 of Yeovil's 53 matches. James Hayter and January signing Gozie Ugwu were the club's top scorers with 5 goals each, with all of those coming in the league.

The end of the season saw new manager Paul Sturrock perform a major clear out of the Yeovil squad, with eleven players released including Fergus Bell, Liam Davis, Craig Eastmond, Joel Grant, James Hayter, Sam Hoskins, Kieffer Moore, Nathan Ralph, Alex Smith, Seth Nana Twumasi and Gozie Ugwu. Club captain Joe Edwards rejected an offer of a new contract and left the club, while midfielder Kevin Dawson and Sam Foley were also offered new contracts and goalkeeper Chris Weale was offered a fresh contract. In addition the club made offers to terminate the contracts of A-Jay Leitch-Smith, James Berrett, Adam Morgan and Artur Krysiak. Morgan was the first of the four to agree to terminate his contract to join Accrington Stanley on a one-year deal, midfielder Berrett left for York City, while Krysiak decided to remain at the club. On 26 May, the Sturrock agreed a new two-year contract with the club having been working with the club informally since April. On 18 June, midfielder Sam Foley rejected the club's offer of a new contract to sign a two-year deal with Port Vale, while the following day Kevin Dawson signed a new two-year contract with the club.

Club
The club's management team and backroom staff remained the same as the 2013–14 season. After a poor start to the season manager Gary Johnson, on 4 February, was sacked and replaced by his assistant Terry Skiverton as acting first team manager with Darren Way being promoted to acting assistant manager. On 9 April, Skiverton having failed to lift Yeovil off the foot of the table was replaced by former Plymouth Argyle manager Paul Sturrock. After the club's relegation to League Two was confirmed the club announced the departure of goalkeeping coach Gareth Stewart due to financial cutbacks.

A new home and away kit were introduced late in pre-season due to quality issues from manufacturer Sondico, which also delayed its sale until late August. The new home kit again featured green and white hoops, but in the new kit the green stripe is itself made up of six green stripes. While the away kit saw a change from the previous fluorescent designs, instead the away kit featured a gold jersey with green trim. Both kits continued to feature W+S Recycling as the club's main sponsor but with the addition of Thatchers Cider as the new rear shirt sponsor.

Coaching staff

Until 4 February 2015

From 4 February to 9 April 2015

After 9 April 2015

Kit

|
|

Transfers

In

Out

Loan in

Loan out

Match results
League positions are sourced from Statto, while the remaining contents of each table are sourced from the references in the "Ref" column.

League One

League table

FA Cup

League Cup

Football League Trophy

Squad statistics
Source:

Numbers in parentheses denote appearances as substitute.
Players with squad numbers struck through and marked  left the club during the playing season.
Players with names in italics and marked * were on loan from another club for the whole of their season with Yeovil.
Players listed with no appearances have been in the matchday squad but only as unused substitutes.
Key to positions: GK – Goalkeeper; DF – Defender; MF – Midfielder; FW – Forward

Suspensions

See also
 2014–15 in English football
 List of Yeovil Town F.C. seasons

References

2014–15 Football League One by team
2014-15